The National Grid for Learning (NGfL) was a UK government-funded gateway to educational resources on the Internet.  It featured many individually selected links to resources and materials deemed to be of high quality. The NGfL was specifically set up to support English schools; separate 'grids' were set up for schools in Northern Ireland, Scotland and Wales.

The NGfL portal was launched in November 1998, as the portal for the DfES National Grid for Learning strategy.  This programme aimed to help learners and educators in the United Kingdom benefit from information and communications technology (ICT). It was one of several new programmes initiated by the new Labour government which took office in May 1997 and had a linked budget of earmarked funds to be spent on schools internet connections and ICT. The portal was funded and managed by the Government's lead agency for ICT in education, Becta (British Educational Communications and Technology Agency).

Regional Broadband Consortia (RBCs) were created in 2000 under the auspices of what was at the time the Department for  Education and Skills, (DfES) to secure lower prices for broadband connections and services for schools by aggregating demand across a region and entering into region wide contracts. Since then, these consortia have expanded their remit and have taken over some of the original aims of the NGfL.

On 13 April 2006, Becta closed the National Grid for Learning portal, stating that it was "improving its offer to teachers by rationalising the number of different services it provides for schools and teaching staff".  According to the agency, "this is being achieved by integrating valued components of the NGfL into its existing services".

The concept of the NGfL lives on, however. The RBCs have worked collaboratively since 2001, and have since been actively joined in their partnership by equivalent organizations in Northern Ireland (C2kNI), Scotland (Glow) and Wales (NGfL Cymru) to form the national education network (NEN), utilizing the JANET network to provide a single, secure private network available to provide shared resources amongst all UK schools. 

In 2019, London Grid for Learning bought the "National Grid for Learning" trademark as part of its plan to expand broadband connectivity for schools and public authorities.

See also
 London Grid for Learning
 Regional Broadband Consortium

References

Further reading
The Guardian: A gigantic online swapshop describes a North West Learning Grid project called the National Digital Resource Bank.

External links
 National Education Network
 NI Grid for Learning
 Glow (Scotland)
 NGfL Cymru

Education in the United Kingdom
Governmental educational technology organizations
Information technology organisations based in the United Kingdom